Lea County–Zip Franklin Memorial Airport  is a county-owned, public-use airport in Lea County, New Mexico, United States. Located three nautical miles (6 km) west of the central business district of Lovington, New Mexico, it is also known as Lovington Airport. The airport is named for aviator Oliver Gene "Zip" Franklin. It is included in the National Plan of Integrated Airport Systems for 2011–2015, which categorized it as a general aviation facility.

Facilities and aircraft 
Lea County–Zip Franklin Memorial Airport covers an area of 400 acres (162 ha) at an elevation of 3,979 feet (1,213 m) above mean sea level. It has two runways with asphalt surfaces: 3/21 is 6,001 by 75 feet (1,829 x 23 m) and 12/30 is 4,409 by 60 feet (1,344 x 18 m).

For the 12-month period ending April 7, 2011, the airport had 2,200 general aviation aircraft operations, an average of 183 per month. At that time there were 7 aircraft based at this airport: 71% single-engine and 29% multi-engine.

References

External links 
 Aerial image as of September 1996 from USGS The National Map
 
 
 

Airports in New Mexico
Buildings and structures in Lea County, New Mexico
Transportation in Lea County, New Mexico